The Olperer is a  mountain in the Zillertal Alps in the Austrian federal state of Tyrol. It is the main summit on the Tux Crest (Tuxer Kamm) and is often crossed in the summer as climbers transit from the Olperer Hut to the Geraer Hut. It was first climbed on 10 September 1867 along the southeast ridge (Südostgrat) by Paul Grohmann, Georg Samer and Gainer Jackl. On its north flank is the ski region known as Hintertux Glacier on the Gefrorene-Wand-Kees glacier (also called the Tuxer Ferner).

Location and area 
The Olperer, with its pyramidal summit block, presents a striking appearance. As a result of that and because of its geographical prominence over its nearby peaks, the summit is a popular viewing point. It lies about four kilometres as the crow flies northwest of the Schlegeisspeicher dam and seven kilometres south of Hintertux. Its neighbours are, to the north and separated by the Wildlahnerscharte (3,220 m), the Großer Kaserer at 3,266 metres, to the southeast along the crest the  Fußstein and, to the northeast, separated by the Großes Riepenkees glacier, lie the twin peaks of the Gefrorene-Wand-Spitzen, the southern summit of which lies at a height of 3,270 metres.

Sources and maps 
 H. Klier und W. Klier: Alpine Club Guide Zillertaler Alpen, Munich, 1996, 
 Alpine Club Map 1:25,000, Sheet 35/1, Zillertaler Alpen West

References

External links 
 The Olperer at Summitpost
 Bergrettung Ginzling – info about the Zillertal Alps
 Olperer Southeast and North Ridges: Tour description with photos at alpin-welt.at

Alpine three-thousanders
Mountains of Tyrol (state)
Zillertal Alps
Mountains of the Alps